Edward Benedicks (9 February 1879 – 24 August 1960) was a Swedish sport shooter who competed at the 1908, the 1912 and the 1920 Summer Olympics.

In 1908 he finished 27th in the individual trap event.

Four years later he won the silver medal in the running deer, double shots competition.

In the running deer, single shots event he finished 26th and in the individual trap event he finished 38th.

In 1920 he won his second silver medal with the Swedish team in the running deer, double shots competition. He also participated in the running deer, single shots event and in the running deer, double shots event but for both contests his results are unknown.

References

External links
profile

1879 births
1960 deaths
Swedish male sport shooters
Running target shooters
Olympic shooters of Sweden
Shooters at the 1908 Summer Olympics
Shooters at the 1912 Summer Olympics
Shooters at the 1920 Summer Olympics
Olympic silver medalists for Sweden
Trap and double trap shooters
Olympic medalists in shooting
Medalists at the 1912 Summer Olympics
Medalists at the 1920 Summer Olympics
19th-century Swedish people
20th-century Swedish people